Sir Duncan Robin Carmichael Christopher  (born 13 October 1944) is a British retired diplomat, now a consultant and charity trustee.

Career
Christopher was educated at Keble College, Oxford, and the Fletcher School of Law and Diplomacy at Tufts University. He joined the Foreign and Commonwealth Office (FCO) in 1970 and served at New Delhi, Lusaka and Madrid before being appointed ambassador to the Federal Democratic Republic of Ethiopia 1994–1997, ambassador to the Republic of Indonesia 1997–2000 and ambassador to the Argentine Republic 2000–2004.

Christopher retired from the Diplomatic Service after his posting to Argentina. He was secretary-general 2007–11 and projects director 2011–15 of the Global Leadership Foundation. He has been a trustee of the Brooke Hospital for Animals, Partners for Change Ethiopia (then known as St Matthew's Children's Fund), Prospect Burma and Redress.

Honours
Christopher was appointed CMG in the 1997 Birthday Honours and knighted KBE in the 2000 New Year Honours.

References

1944 births
Living people
Alumni of Keble College, Oxford
The Fletcher School at Tufts University alumni
Ambassadors of the United Kingdom to Ethiopia
Ambassadors of the United Kingdom to Indonesia
Ambassadors of the United Kingdom to Argentina
Knights Commander of the Order of the British Empire
Companions of the Order of St Michael and St George